Great Irish Households: Inventories from the Long Eighteenth Century presents in a single volume transcripts of inventories of fourteen great country houses, three Dublin town houses and one London town house, published as a tribute to the last Knight of Glin. The inventories, all but two published for the first time, span the period from 1702, the year of William of Orange's death, to 1821, the year of George IV's coronation. 

In 2003, Jane Fenlon, the historian of Irish art and architecture of the early modern period, had lamented the fact that inventories were a "rather neglected area of study" and had stressed how important it was that they "should not be treated as mere records of house furnishings", but "be seen as valuable research sources rich in information . . ." Regrettably, as Simon Swynfen Jervis's book British and Irish inventories bears out, there is still a dearth of Irish household inventories available in published form. By making more of them available in transcript, however, the book Great Irish Households has helped meet this acknowledged need.

Structure
A preface by Leslie Fitzpatrick and a foreword by Toby Barnard give a broad historical setting for the transcriptions. The inventories themselves, drawn up for probate or for a variety of other purposes by specialist appraisers together with family members or their staff, are given preambles by way of introduction to the houses and are supplemented with a glossary and indexes to personal names and to the items listed. There are also appendices identifying the books listed in abridged form in inventories from three of the houses: at Kilkenny Castle, in the second Duchess of Ormonde's closet (1705); at the bishop's mansion house, Elphin, Co. Roscommon, in the study (1740); at Newbridge House, Co. Dublin, in the library (1821). The inventories are grouped as follows:
1 Lismore Castle, Co. Waterford, 1702/3
 
The Ormonde inventories
2 Kilkenny Castle, Co. Kilkenny,1705
3 Dublin Castle, 1707
4 The Duke of Ormonde's house at St James's Square, London, c. 1710
 
5 Bishop's mansion house, Elphin, Co. Roscommon, 1740
6 Captain Balfour's town house, auction sale, Dublin, 1741/2
7 Hillsborough Castle, Co. Down, 1746 and 1777
8 Kilrush House, Freshford, Co. Kilkenny, 1750
9 No. 10 Henrietta Street, Dublin (Luke Gardiner's house), 1772
10 Morristown Lattin, Co. Kildare, 1773
11 Baronscourt, Co. Tyrone, 1782
12 Castlecomer House, Co. Kilkenny, 1798
13 Killadoon, Co. Kildare, 1807–29
14 Shelton Abbey, near Arklow, Co. Wicklow, 1816
15 Borris House, Co. Carlow, 1818
16 Carton House, Co. Kildare, 1818
17 Newbridge House, Co. Dublin, 1821
18 Mount Stewart, Co. Down, 1821
 

The end matter comprises:
 Glossary
 Appendix I: Sales by buyer at Captain Balfour's town house sale, 1741/2
 Appendix II: Books in the 2nd Duchess of Ormonde's closet at Kilkenny Castle, Co. Kilkenny, 1705
 Appendix III: Books in the bishop of Elphin's study, Co. Roscommon, 1740
 Appendix IV: Books in the library at Newbridge House, Co. Dublin, 1821
 List of inventory sources
 List of plates
 Bibliography
 Index of personal names
 General index

Other than Castlecomer House and the bishop's mansion house at Elphin, all the houses featured, some since modified, refashioned or rebuilt, are still standing to this day. Several of them are still the abodes of the same families.

Critical reception
The historian and writer Adrian Tinniswood captures the essence of the book when in the Critic, he declares that it is "A box of geeky delights, certainly, but also a fabulous (one might even say indispensable) source for the scholarly study of the Irish country house . . ." He also alludes to the book's "excellent glossary, that essential component of published inventories".

In his review "Listed buildings" in Apollo, Robert O'Byrne, the historian of Irish architecture and the decorative arts, reminds us that household inventories, Irish or otherwise, vary in what they include and what they omit. Such omissions hint at their "fascination and fallibility", he ventures, and goes on to say: "When it comes to country house contents, they provide us with a great deal of information, but rarely all of it". Nevertheless, across the inventories transcribed in the book, spanning some 120 years, he reassures us that "it is possible to see how the decoration and design of affluent Irish households changed". 

Writing in Country Life, Kate Green sees historic household inventories that record the contents of rooms as "an essential documentary tool for understanding the use and appearance of houses in the distant past", and, for the benefit of those "with a serious interest in Irish Georgian houses", sees Great Irish Households as "an essential work of reference". The book's usefulness to researchers is likewise acknowledged by James Rothwell, National Curator, Decorative Arts, National Trust, who avers: "[This] will be an invaluable and rich source of information for scholars and I know I will be using it on a regular basis." These views are shared by Christopher Ridgway in the Journal of the History of Collections when he writes: "[T]his collection is a cornucopia of information, and while its primary audience will be scholars and curators, there is plenty to be gleaned from the listings for anyone interested in historic interiors".

While the architectural historian Peter Pearson, reviewing the book for the Irish Arts Review, admires the book, "a beautiful production — elegantly laid out, printed and bound into a neat volume, with a fine dust jacket", he wishes there was more information given about what became of the items listed. "Where are these objects now? Have any survived at all? Only occasionally are we told."

In her article about the book in the Irish Times, Bernice Harrison recognizes the usefulness of the transcribed inventories for artistic directors working on historical films. "It's not hard to see how a set designer on a film set in a grand 18th-century house would pore over the details in the book to find out how many paintings to put in the hall, whether there should be a rug on the floor and might it really be made of velvet . . . "

Notes

References

Bibliography 
 Fenlon, Jane. Goods & Chattels: A Survey of Early Household Inventories in Ireland, Kilkenny, Heritage Council, Stationery Office, 2003  
 ffolliott, Rosemary. "Captain Balfour's auction, 15th March 1741–2", The Irish Ancestor, vol. XVI, no. 1 (1984), pp. 21–31
 Jervis, Simon Swynfen. British and Irish Inventories: A List and Bibliography of Published Transcriptions of Secular Inventories. Leeds, Furniture History Society, 2010  
 Joyce, Edmund. Borris House, Co. Carlow, and Elite Regency Patronage, Maynooth studies in local history, no. 108. Dublin, Four Courts Press, 2013

External links
 Book's official website

2022 non-fiction books
British non-fiction books
Cultural history of Ireland
18th century in Ireland
Social history of Ireland
Architecture books
History books about the 18th century
History books about Ireland